Stick It Live is a live EP by American glam metal band Slaughter. The EP was released by Chrysalis Records shortly after the release of the band's debut album. It was also certified gold. The sleevenotes state it was "Recorded Live in the summer of 1990 in Nashville, TN; Knoxville, TN; Atlanta, GA."

Track listing

Bonus tracks omitted from 2005 remaster.

Personnel
Mark Slaughter - Lead Vocals, Guitar, and Keyboards
Tim Kelly - Guitar
Dana Strum - Bass
Blas Elias - Drums

Production
Art Direction: Glen Wexler
Photography: Glen Wexler

Slaughter (band) albums
1990 live albums
Chrysalis Records live albums
Live EPs